Saloma is an unincorporated community in Taylor County, Kentucky, United States.  It lies along Routes 527 and 744 northwest of the city of Campbellsville, the county seat of Taylor County.  Its elevation is 906 feet (276 m).

Saloma was established in 1838, and had its own post office during the 19th century.  The origin of the name "Saloma" is unknown.

References

Unincorporated communities in Taylor County, Kentucky
Unincorporated communities in Kentucky